Kannagi was a Tamil language newspaper published in Tamil Nadu, southern India. The first copy was published on the initiative of former Indian National Army officer S. Sakti Mohan on 29 May 1952. It succeeded the publication Netaji, which had started in 1948. Soon it became the regional organ of the All India Forward Bloc in Tamil Nadu.

Kannagi identified itself as a 'Revolutionary Nationalist Forthnightly', and its motto was 'All Power to the people'. By 1957 Kannagi had a circulation of around 10 000.

In 1977 the publication of Kannagi was discontinued.

References

Defunct newspapers published in India

All India Forward Bloc
Tamil-language newspapers published in India
1952 establishments in Madras State
Newspapers established in 1952
Mass media in Tamil Nadu
Publications disestablished in 1977